Herbert Edward Trevor  (16 December 1871 – 23 March 1939) was an English cricketer. Trevor's batting style is unknown. He was born at Paddington, London.

While in the British Raj in December 1892, Trevor was selected to play in Bombay's inaugural first-class match against Lord Hawke's XI at the Bombay Gymkhana. Lord Hawke's XI won the toss and elected to bat first, making 263 all out. In response, Bombay made 157 all out, with Trevor being dismissed for 12 runs by Arthur Gibson. Forced to follow-on in their second-innings, Bombay made 140 all out, setting Lord Hawke's XI a target of 35 for victory. They reached their target with 8 wickets to spare. He later made two first-class appearances for Sussex in the 1908 County Championship, against Kent at the St Lawrence Ground, Canterbury, and Essex at the County Ground, Leyton. He scored 39 runs in his two matches, with a high score of 22 not out.

Trevor served with the King's Own Yorkshire Light Infantry in the First World War. He was awarded the Distinguished Service Order, and was made a Companion of the Order of St Michael and St George in the 1918 New Year Honours.

He died at Kemp Town, Sussex, on 23 March 1939.

References

External links
Herbert Trevor at ESPNcricinfo
Herbert Trevor at CricketArchive

1871 births
1939 deaths
People from Paddington
English cricketers
Mumbai cricketers
Sussex cricketers
Companions of the Order of St Michael and St George
Companions of the Distinguished Service Order
British Army personnel of World War I